Le Gua is the name of 2 communes in France:

 Le Gua, Charente-Maritime
 Le Gua, Isère